Calyptoliva is a genus of sea snails, marine gastropod mollusks in the family Olividae.

Species
Species within the genus Calyptoliva include:

 Calyptoliva amblys Kantor & Bouchet, 2007
 Calyptoliva bbugeae Kantor, Fedosov, Puillandre & Bouchet, 2016
 Calyptoliva bolis Kantor & Bouchet, 2007
 Calyptoliva tatyanae Kantor & Bouchet, 2007

References

Olividae
Gastropod genera